Mount Pleasant is the county seat of and largest city in Titus County,  in the U.S. state of Texas. As of the 2020 census, Mount Pleasant's population was 16,047; it is situated in Northeast Texas.

History
Mount Pleasant was founded May 11, 1848, to serve as county seat for Titus County, which was created by a legislative act on May 11, 1846. Until after the Civil War, Titus County also included the territory of present-day Franklin and Morris Counties. High waters along the creeks and the Sulphur River often halted travel in the early years.

In the 21st century, Titus County comprises the Mount Pleasant micropolitan statistical area, named for the county seat.

Geography
Mount Pleasant is located at  (33.157891, −94.970084).

Climate
Mount Pleasant is considered to have a humid subtropical climate.

Demographics

As of the 2020 United States census, 16,047 people, 5,553 households, and 3,896 families were residing in the city. As of the census of 2000, 13,935 people, 4,558 households, and 3,208 families resided in the city.  The population density was 1,112.0 people per square mile (429.4/km).  The racial makeup of the city was 56.70% White, 16.00% African American, 0.55% Native American, 0.84% Asian, 23.58% from other races, and 2.33% from two or more races. Hispanics or Latinos of any race were 40.65% of the population.

In the city, the age distribution was 31.2% under 18, 10.9% from 18 to 24, 28.1% from 25 to 44, 16.2% from 45 to 64, and 13.6% who were 65 or older. The median age was 20 years. For every 100 females, there were 94.8 males. For every 100 females 18 and over, there were 89.6 males.

The median income for a household in the city was $28,805, and for a family was $32,331. Males had a median income of $22,629 versus $17,080 for females. The per capita income for the city was $14,190. About 20.3% of families and 22.8% of the population were below the poverty line, including 30.7% of those under age 18 and 16.1% of those age 65 or over.

Mount Pleasant has grown since the 2000 Census; as of 2010, Mount Pleasant had a population of 15,564.

Arts and culture

 Titus County Courthouse—located at the Downtown Square, the courthouse is an important historical building. The courthouse has burned down three times since 1850. The current building was constructed in 1895; it suffered damage in a 1960s fire, in which all county records were destroyed.
 Downtown Square is bordered by several locally owned businesses.
 Mount Pleasant is the site of Wal-Mart's first store in Texas.
 Radar (2006–2008), the world's tallest living horse, lived in Mount Pleasant. (In 2005, Goliath was recorded as the world's tallest living horse by Guinness Book of World Records).
 Mount Pleasant is a nationally recognized Texas Main Street City under the program of the National Trust for Historic Preservation.
 One of the largest Dr. Pepper murals in the United States is located on the side of a building that once housed a Dr. Pepper bottler.

Education

The majority of the City of Mount Pleasant is served by the Mount Pleasant Independent School District. A portion is served by the Harts Bluff Independent School District, instead of the Mount Pleasant district, for grades K–8.
Mount Pleasant High School is a 5A school. The mascot is the Tiger.

Northeast Texas Community College is also located in Titus County.
Chapel Hill High School is a 3A school. The mascot is the Red Devil.

Media
The Mount Pleasant Tribune is a twice-a-week newspaper which was founded in 1941.

Infrastructure

Transportation

A major project underway to build a 271 loop bypass around Mount Pleasant was completed in 2015.

Healthcare
The City of Mount Pleasant is served by Titus Regional Medical Center.

Postal service
The United States Postal Service operates the Mount Pleasant Post Office.

Parole office
The Texas Department of Criminal Justice (TDCJ) operates the Mount Pleasant District Parole Office in Mount Pleasant.

Notable people

 Melvin Aldridge, former professional football player
 Krista Branch, singer of the song "I Am America," referred to as the anthem of the Tea Party movement
 Maury Buford, punter for 1985 Chicago Bears Super Bowl team
 Norm Duke, PBA bowler
 Michael Kopech, professional baseball pitcher
 Barry Minter, former National Football League (NFL) linebacker for the Chicago Bears and Cleveland Browns, appeared in 16 games for Cleveland in 2001 before retiring to Mount Pleasant
 Ray Price, country music singer
 Bill Ratliff, politician
 Jason Roy, lead singer of the Dove Award-winning Christian rock band  Building 429
 Sam W. Russell, Texas legislator and lawyer
 Jerry Scoggins, American country/western singer, guitarist, and band leader, most noted for singing "The Ballad of Jed Clampett", the theme song of the 1960s sitcom The Beverly Hillbillies
 Chaun Thompson, former NFL linebacker for the Houston Texans

References

External links

City of Mount Pleasant
Mount Pleasant Daily Tribune

Cities in Texas
Cities in Titus County, Texas
County seats in Texas
Micropolitan areas of Texas